Hypopyra malgassica is a moth of the family Erebidae first described by Paul Mabille in 1878. This moth species is commonly found in Madagascar.

References

Moths of Madagascar
Moths of Africa
Moths described in 1878
Hypopyra